Severija Janušauskaitė (born 22 October 1981) is a Lithuanian stage and film actress, occasionally performing as a singer, composer, costume designer and fashion model. She is well known for her role in the drama film Star (2014), for which she received an Award for Best Actress at the Kinotavr Film Festival, a Golden Eagle Award for Best Supporting Actress as well as Nika Award and White Elephant Award nominations in several categories. Other popular works include the comedy film The Norseman (2015) as well as the TV series The Optimists and Babylon Berlin (both 2017).

Early life

Severija Janušauskaitė was born on 22 October 1981 in Šiauliai. Her mother is a teacher and her father is a power engineer. She has a sister working as an intellectual property lawyer, currently at the trade association representing the recording industry.

Janušauskaitė showed interest in arts already as a child, taking example from her grandfather, a multi-instrumentalist. Later on, she studied music and graduated from a fine arts school. Finally, she chose a theatre and film study program and graduated from the Lithuanian Academy of Music and Theatre in 2005.

Career
Since 2003, Janušauskaitė has performed at several Lithuanian theatres, such as the State Youth Theatre of Lithuania, Oskaras Koršunovas Theatre (OKT), VDU / Mens Publica Theatre, and Lėlė (Vilnius Puppet Theatre), as well as the Arts Printing House, a creative space in Vilnius.

After being selected in an open competition, Janušauskaitė was hired in 2006 to play her first major stage role in Woman from the Past, based on a play by Roland Schimmelpfennig. One year later, she played the role of Queen Margaret in Ivona, Princess of Burgundia, accepting an offer by Jonas Vaitkus, her postgraduate studies professor. For her role of Liucija in the drama Patriots at the Lithuanian State Youth Theatre, in 2008 Severija Janušauskaitė was nominated for the Golden Stage Cross, the highest theatre award of Lithuania. She later played other main characters, such as Barbara in Barbara and Sigismund and Elisabet Vogler in an adaptation of Ingmar Bergman's film Persona. The actress was awarded a Fortune Diploma and a Young Theatre Critics Award in 2013 for her portrayal of Lulu in Intimacy at VDU Theatre.

Janušauskaitė started her film career in 2004 with the short film The Flame. Later, she appeared in two TV series, War and Peace (2007), an international co-production, and the Norwegian Honeytrap (2008). Her first feature film was the Lithuanian-Hungarian ironic drama  (2010), where she played one of the main roles. This film, directed by Saulius Drunga, won the Silver George Award for the best film in the Perspectives competition at the 33rd Moscow International Film Festival. Its screenplay received the New Talent Award at the Cannes Film Festival in 2007.

Janušauskaitė gained popularity in Russia and abroad for her role in Anna Melikian's film Star (2014). Her performance of socialite Margarita was highly praised by film critics, resulting in the Best Actress Award at the 25th Sochi Open Russian Film Festival (2014), a Golden Eagle Award for Best Supporting Actress (2015) as well as Nika Award and White Elephant Award nominations in the categories Best Actress and Discovery of the Year (both 2015). Following the success in Sochi, Severija Janušauskaitė participated as a jury member in the 15th .

The following years were characterized by growing critical and public acclaim. In 2013 and 2015, Janušauskaitė was nominated for the Best Lithuanian Actress Award at Vilnius International Film Festival. Her performances in the TV series Godfather (2014) and films such as The Norseman (2015) and Dreamfish (2016) were also widely covered by the news media. The latter film participated in the competition of the 27th Kinotavr Film Festival in Sochi and was nominated for the Russian Guild of Film Critics Award in the category Best Debut Film (2016). For her role of the mermaid Helena in Dreamfish, Janušauskaitė received the Best Actress Award at the 25th Honfleur Russian Film Festival.

In 2017, Janušauskaitė became known to a broad audience in Russia and Germany thanks to her roles in major television films. In Russia, the actress is currently widely associated with her performance as Ruta Blaumane, chief of an analytical group in the Soviet Ministry of Foreign Affairs in the 1960s, in Alexey Popogrebsky's historical drama The Optimists screened on Russia-1 TV channel in April. In Germany, Janušauskaitė is known for her role as double agent Svetlana Sorokina in another period drama set in 1920s Berlin, Tom Tykwer's Babylon Berlin that had its premiere in October on Sky 1. In this to date most expensive German TV series, the actress also appears as the singer Nikoros and performs inter alia the film's main theme, released under the pseudonym Severija. In October 2018, after the series started to air on free TV, the song became the most popular song in Germany's Amazon and iTunes download charts.  She considers the role in Babylon Berlin as her most memorable one so far.

Janušauskaitė has many interests and does not work solely as an actress. She wrote music for the children's theatre performances The Little Match Girl (at Arts Printing House) and Evolution, designed costumes for Now You See It / Now You Don't (both at Vilnius Puppet Theatre). Apart from that, she also appears as a fashion model.

Personal life

Janušauskaitė likes singing and plays piano. Her hobbies also include reading, painting, sewing, dancing, yoga, swimming, fencing and make-up design. Besides Lithuanian, she speaks English, German and Russian. She is married to the director of the Vilnius Puppet Theatre and has a son from her first marriage.

Works

Theatre

Film

Dubbing

Accolades

References

Further reading

External links

 
 
 Severija Janušauskaitė on KinoPoisk
 Severija Janušauskaitė on Spotify

1981 births
Living people
People from Šiauliai
21st-century Lithuanian actresses
Lithuanian stage actresses
Lithuanian film actresses
Lithuanian television actresses
Lithuanian Academy of Music and Theatre alumni
21st-century Lithuanian women singers